"Hits of the Year" is a U.S. single released from Squeeze's sixth album, Cosi Fan Tutti Frutti. The song describes a holiday flight interrupted by a hijacking. It charted only on the Billboard Top Rock Tracks chart, peaking at number 39.

Cash Box said it has "a straight ahead rhythm groove and typically elastic musical shadings."

Track listing
 "Hits of the Year" (3:03)
 "The Fortnight Saga" (2:38)

References

External links
Squeeze discography at Squeezenet

Squeeze (band) songs
1985 singles
1985 songs
Songs written by Glenn Tilbrook
Songs written by Chris Difford
A&M Records singles